Heavyweight boxers Muhammad Ali and Oscar Bonavena fought at Madison Square Garden in New York City on December 7, 1970. Ali won the bout, his first at the current Madison Square Garden, through a technical knockout in the 15th round.

According to Ferdie Pacheco, Ali absorbed more punishment in this particular fight than in any of his previous fights, and it was a mistake for Ali to have fought with Bonavena just before his first fight with Joe Frazier.

Background
Many experts believed Ali was making a mistake by fighting with Bonavena in only his second fight after his 3½ year break from professional boxing. Christened "The Bull" by the press, Bonavena was a hard puncher; he was the only boxer at this time who had gone the full distance with Joe Frazier in two hard fought fights, knocking down Frazier twice in the first bout, and forcing Frazier on the defensive in the final rounds of the second bout. Thirty-seven of Bonavena's previous forty-five boxing opponents had been knocked out.

Buildup
At the weigh-in, it was Bonavena who took the initiative of indulging in psychological warfare. In broken English, Bonavena shouted to Ali: "You cheekeen...You no go in Army." Continuing with the verbal tirade, Bonavena went on to call Ali a "black kangaroo", indicated that Ali had hygiene problems, and, using an old Sonny Liston line, accused Ali of being a homosexual. Ali was left to making gestures indicating Bonavena was crazy. After the weigh-in, however, Ali began his own psychological attack by turning up unannounced in Bonavena's dressing room and shouting hysterically at his opponent until he was ejected by Bonavena's entourage from the room. On the day of the fight Ali announced:

The fight

Rounds 1–3
For the first three rounds it was a vintage Ali repelling the brave but crude Bonavena. José Torres, who witnessed the bout, wrote that in the first round of the fight Ali looked like a bullfighter and Bonavena like a bull. Torres went on to write:

Rounds 4–8
In the middle of round 4, Ali began to tire and retreated to the ropes; Bonavena now had a stationary target to hit. From rounds 4 through 8 of the fight, Ali continued defensive boxing with Bonavena stalking him relentlessly. Leaning back against the ropes, Ali started depending on his reflexes rather than his feet to avoid Bonavena's punches. However, the body shots Bonavena was throwing at Ali started connecting with some regularity. The fight became insipid with Bonavena pursuing Ali, but lacking the requisite technique to end the bout.

Round 9
Prior to the match, Ali had predicted that round 9 would be the final round of this bout. As it turned out, both fighters kept punching each other throughout this round. The round began with Ali landing a strong punch on Bonavena's jaw, but as Ali moved in purposefully, the bout became a slugging contest with Bonavena hitting back. In the melee, Bonavena's hook found Ali's jaw, and Ali was hurt. Reflecting on this moment in the fight, Ali later observed:

Rounds 10–14
After the fiercely contested ninth round, the fight degenerated into an insipid affair with Ali engaging in defensive boxing. As Torres wrote:

Round 15
In the final round of the bout, Bonavena, realizing that he needed a knockout to win the match, started throwing a barrage of punches at Ali. As Bonavena was preparing to throw a right at Ali, he was suddenly beaten to the punch by Ali's left hook and knocked down. Bonavena got up and was knocked down again; he got up a third time and was again knocked down by Ali after which the fight was stopped. Bonavena's trainer Gil Clancy remembered:

Aftermath
After the fight, Ali grabbed a microphone and shouted:
Ali's next boxing match was with Joe Frazier. Bonavena later died under tragic circumstances in 1976.

References

Bonavena
1970 in boxing
December 1970 sports events in the United States